The 2020 Clásica de Almería was the 35th edition of the Clásica de Almería road cycling one day race. It was held on 16 February 2020 as part of the UCI ProSeries in category 1.Pro. The race was won by defending champion Pascal Ackermann of Germany.

Teams
Twenty teams of up to seven riders started the race:

Result

References 

Clásica de Almería
Clásica de Almería
Clásica de Almería
2020 UCI ProSeries
Clásica de Almería